Gredice may refer to:

 Gredice, Bosnia and Herzegovina, a village near Brčko, Bosnia
 Gredice, Croatia, a village near Klanjec, Croatia